Manish Tiwary is an Indian film director and screenwriter. He has directed and written films like Issaq and Dil Dosti Etc.

Early life and career
Manish completed his school education from Sainik School Tilaiya, a boarding school in a small town in Jharkhand. Manish Tiwary studied Zoology at Hindu College in Delhi University. Manish later got postgraduate education at Cambridge University, UK, and Yale University, USA. Manish worked for the Food and Agriculture Organization of the United Nations in Rome, Nepal and India and has published articles concerning political ecology in the Economic and Political Weekly of India. His monograph titled, Participatory Forest Policies and Politics in India: Joint Forest Management Institutions in Jharkhand and West Bengal was published by Ashgate, UK.

Bollywood
Manish directed two films, Dil Dosti Etc and Issaq, in a gap of six years.

Filmography
 Dil Dosti Etc (2007)
 Issaq (2013)

References

External links
 
 

1982 births
Living people
Hindi-language film directors
Film directors from Bihar
Hindu College, Delhi alumni